Kayden Francis (born 17 February 2003) is a South African professional footballer who plays as a midfielder for South African Premier Division side Chippa United. Born in Port Elizabeth, he joined the city's local top-flight side in 2019 where he became the club's youngest-ever player upon making his debut in November the following year.

Club career

Chippa United

Francis joined Chippa United in 2019 when he signed for the club's development side, who at the time were coached by his uncle and former Ajax Cape Town, Santos and Bay United defender, Duran Francis. He rapidly progressed through the ranks and was promoted to the first team the following year, going on to make his debut as a second-half substitute for Tsietsi Khooa during a 1–1 draw against TTM on 29 November 2020. Upon doing so, at the age of 17 years, nine months and 13 days, he became the youngest-ever player to represent the club in the league.

Career statistics

Club

1 Includes Nedbank Cup matches.
2 Includes Telkom Knockout matches.
3 Includes MTN 8 matches.

References

2003 births
Living people
South African soccer players
Association football midfielders
Chippa United F.C. players
South African Premier Division players